Look for a Woman is a 1983 Soviet crime comedy television film adaptation of the play "La Perruche et le Poulet" by French writer Robert Thomas, directed by Alla Surikova.

Plot
An ordinary day at a Parisian notary office comes to a tragic end. Telephonist of notary Rocher, Mademoiselle Alice Postic, stays late at the office to chat with her friend on the phone and ends up finding her boss in death's throes, with a dagger in his back. After calling the police, Alice faints, but when the policeman arrives, it turns out that the corpse has disappeared! Arriving on call, the police inspector Grandin turns out to be Alice's long-time acquaintance, but now he in every possible way disavows their love, which was once between him and Mademoiselle Postic. In connection with the murder an investigation begins and the notary together with his wife are the main suspects. But everything ends in the most ridiculous way: in the midst of interrogations, the "late" Rocher arrives in the office, who spent an evening at the opera!

... Alice Postic becomes a subject of ridicule from colleagues and acquaintances. But suddenly she finds some foreign objects in the office, and later the police find the corpse of an unknown young man in a park near the notary's bureau. Linking the found objects with the death of the stranger, Alice begins her own investigation, in which she then helps, then interferes with her friend, Inspector Grandin. It turns out that the murdered young man is Jullien Nalestro, lover of notary Rocher's wife. All the evidence indicates that the notary killed his rival out of jealousy. However, clever Alice suggests Grandin to set up a trap to catch the real killer...

Cast
 Sofiko Chiaureli – Alice Postic, telephonist
 Leonid Kuravlyov – Henri Grandin, police inspector 
 Sergei Yursky – Maître Rocher, head of the notary office
 Yelena Solovey – Clara Rocher, Maître Rocher's wife
 Aleksandr Abdulov – Robert de Charance, Maître Rocher's assistant
 Lyudmila Dmitrieva – Suzanne Brissard, Maître Rocher's personal secretary
 Yelena Ukrashchyonok – Virginie Renoir, typist
 Leonid Yarmolnik – Maximin, policeman
 Vladimir Basov – Monsieur Jacques-Pierre Antoine, sad client
 Nina Ter-Osipyan – Madam Tachard, cheerful client

Filming
All the locations mentioned in the movie do exist. At the address of Robert de Charance (19, Gobelen Street, Paris) there is a historic house, which is under the state's protection.
At the beginning of each series, scenes from French films L'Alpagueur (1976) and Death of a Corrupt Man (1977) were used.
The owner of the keyfob found by Alice Postic is first thought to be Maximin's friend Jacques Noiret then the missing Jullien Nalestro. The initials of both are JN, but on the keyfob the wrong initials are inscribed - GN.
In one of the episodes a calendar is shown for the year 1982. In addition, Maître Rocher reports that the next year on a horoscope is the year of the Pig (in reality 1983 is the year of the Pig).
In some episodes of the movie the names of the main characters differ from their real names. Alice calls herself and Inspector Grandin diminutive names which causes Alice to become Lily and Henri - Riri.

References

External links

1983 films
Soviet crime comedy films
1980s crime comedy films
Soviet television films
1980s Russian-language films
1983 comedy films